St. Jerome Cathedral, also known as Ica Cathedral, is a Catholic church in the city of Ica, Peru. It is located on Bolivar street, and forms part of the monumental group of the Company of Jesus.

The church was constructed in the 18th century, and was later retouched in 1814. It was renovated after damage incurred during an earthquake in 2007.

The exterior part of the cathedral building is in the Neoclassical architectural style, and the interior is in the Baroque tradition.

See also
List of cathedrals in Peru
Roman Catholicism in Peru
St. Jerome

References

Roman Catholic cathedrals in Peru
Roman Catholic churches completed in 1759
18th-century Roman Catholic church buildings in Peru
Neoclassical church buildings in Peru